A bridegroom (or groom) is a male wedding partner.

It may also refer to:
 The Bridegroom, the first tale (1825) by Alexander Pushkin
 The Bridegroom, a short work of fiction by Angela Carter
 The Bridegroom (short story collection), by Ha Jin
 Bridegroom (film), a 2013 documentary film
 The Bridegroom, an icon in Eastern Christianity

See also
 Groom (disambiguation)